Flame United Football Club, also known as the Flame United Cherifer Football Club for sponsorship reasons, is a football club based in the province of Cavite, Philippines.

History
Flame United was established in 2005 as an effort to help children of active and retired military personnel to develop their skills in football through the initiatives of Ravelo Saluria, the team's coach.

Saluria together with Perry Camba, who is an engineer, help make Flame United to be a pioneer member of the Cavite Football Association in 2006. The football club expanded from being a kids club since then.

Flame United Football Club entered a partnership with the Arellano University and Philippine Christian University and its players became varsity players of either the two institutions.

Intermed Marketing Phils. the company behind the vitamins brand, Cherifer started to sponsor the team in 2012. Because of the sponsorship the club was able to compete in national competitions and managed to finish as Champions in most of the tournaments it joined. Flame United was able to forge a partnership with Dolphins United and General Trias International FC so that its players can be loaned giving opportunity to its players to play in the second division of the United Football League. The name of the club was changed into Flame United Cherifer Football Club due to sponsorship reasons.

In 2013 the Flame United emerged champions at the Cavite Cup, Cherifer Cup both organized by the Cavite F.A. They also had a favorable finish at the provincial elimination of the 2013 PFF National Men's Club Championship; the squad was able to win the Regional Group Finals and reached the final four of the national tournament. Flame United finished 1st runner-up in the 2013 Philippine National Games Futsal Tournament and the 7th CAFA Cup.

Between 2014 and 2016, the club participated in every PFF-Smart National Club Championships as well as the upcoming semi-professional league, the Mabuhay Champions League and has since then earned the respect of Philippine Football community with respectable finishes in every national championships the club went through with relatively unknown local players in its line-up. The names like Alvin Obero, Chris Pino, Perry Camba, Jr., Julius Lorilla, Jumar Dexisne, Kaiser Orcine, Paolo Salenga, Mark Ian Baldo, Robin Cainglet, Roberto Corsame, Jr, Cymun Sanquillos, Alvin Banta, Mario Titoy, Jericho Desalisa, Jambell Guinabang and Charles Gamutan are only few names that made impact from obscurity before carving their names in the football community.

In 2017, Flame United Cherifer FC won the Mayor Biron Intercollegiate Football Invitational to become the back to back champion.

Honors

League
Mabuhay Champions League
Champion:2015 Mabuhay Champions League Men's Open and Under 15 Category
Champion:2016 Mabuhay Champions League Under 18 Category

Cup
PFF National Men's Club Championship
Semi-finals:2013
PFF Smart U-22 Amateur Football Championship
2nd Runner-up:2016

Other
Philippine National Games (futsal)
Runners-up:2013
Mayor Hernan D. Biron, Sr. Intercollegiate Football Invitational 2016
Champion:2016
Mayor Hernan D. Biron, Sr. Intercollegiate Football Invitational 2017
Champion:2017

References

Football clubs in the Philippines
2005 establishments in the Philippines
Association football clubs established in 2005
Sports in Cavite